The Tampa Bay area has a humid subtropical climate (Köppen Cfa), closely bordering a tropical climate near the waterfront areas. There are two basic seasons in the Tampa Bay area, a hot and wet season from May through October, and a mild and dry season from November through April.

Nearly two-thirds of the annual precipitation falls in the months of June through September. The area is listed by the United States Department of Agriculture (USDA) as being in hardiness zone 9b as well as hardiness zone 10a just along the immediate coast and in peninsular Pinellas; which is about the northern limit of where coconut palms and royal palms can be grown. Highs usually range between  year round. St. Petersburg's all-time record high is exactly .

Pinellas County lies on a peninsula between Tampa Bay and the Gulf of Mexico, and much of the city of Tampa lies on a smaller peninsula jutting out into Tampa Bay. This proximity to large bodies of water both moderates temperatures and introduces large amounts of humidity into the atmosphere. In general, the local communities farthest from the coast have larger temperature ranges, both during a single day and throughout the seasons of the year.

Seasonal weather

Wet season 

The hot and wet season begins in May and lasts through October. Seasonal high temperatures average about 90s °F (around 32 °C) and lows in the mid-70s °F (around 24 °C), accompanied by high humidity and an almost daily chance of thunderstorms, especially in the afternoon. Day-to-day weather is remarkably consistent, with wet season average high and low temperatures usually only about five degrees above or below the record highs and lows. 

The typical summer weather pattern is for heat-produced thermals, powered by either the Gulf or Atlantic sea breeze (and occasionally both simultaneously), to build puffy white cumulus clouds into threatening thunderheads over the interior of the Florida peninsula. Usually, the resulting storms drift slowly westward to the bay area, though they may rain themselves out before reaching Tampa if the easterly winds are light or the sea breeze from the Gulf of Mexico is too strong. Stronger storm cells often survive to move out over the Gulf of Mexico, where they can be seen from the beaches as spectacular nighttime lightning shows. Occasionally, storms form offshore overnight along the land-breeze front which is the dermal counterpart of the daytime sea-breeze front. If the prevailing winds are from the west or southwest, these storms can push ashore into the Tampa Bay area in the morning and move inland, reversing the more common pattern.

Summer thunderstorms typically bring brief periods of heavy rain and gusty winds with frequent cloud-to-ground lightning. Afternoon storms are usually followed by a pleasantly clear and cooler evening, while morning storms usually bring very high humidity levels and a chance for more rain in the afternoon. At times, these storms can grow severe, bringing damaging winds, small hail, and torrential rain, and an occasional tornado. While Florida does rank #1 in the US in terms of tornadoes per square mile, the majority of the twisters are small, weak, and short-lived.  Waterspouts are relatively common in Tampa Bay and off the gulf coast during strong summer thunderstorms, occasionally moving onshore as a short-lived tornado.

Though the Tampa Bay area is sometimes referred to as the "Lightning Capital of the World", it is more accurately called the “Lightning Capital of North America” if measured by average number of days with thunderstorm activity per year. During the summer, west-central Florida receives as much lightning as the world's true lightning leaders such as the Lake Victoria region of Africa and the central Amazon River Basin. However, there are few thunderstorms in the Tampa Bay area from approximately October to May, decreasing the yearly average.

Every year, Florida averages 10 deaths and 30 injuries from lightning strikes, with several of these usually occurring in or around Tampa. University of Florida lightning expert Martin A. Uman has calculated that the average resident is within a half-mile of 10 to 15 lightning strikes every year. TECO Energy, Tampa's electric utility, spends over millions of dollars annually to repair transformers and other equipment damaged by lightning strikes.

Dry season 

The dry season often begins in early November and can last into early May. The local weather during these months is normally sunny, mild, and quite dry, with a general cooling trend through the fall and a slow increase in temperatures starting in February. The occasional passage of a cold front will bring rain followed by a few days of cooler temperatures. Lows rarely reach freezing , an occurrence which happens, on average, once every other year in areas away from the water and less frequently in areas on Tampa Bay or the Gulf of Mexico. While deep freezes are very infrequent, serious cold snaps are a significant concern due to the diverse range of freeze-sensitive agriculture and aquaculture industries in the area as well as tropical landscaping such as coconut palms and royal palms.

Frozen precipitation is very rare in the Tampa Bay area. The only known measurable snowfall in Tampa after 1900 occurred on January 19, 1977. Many residents of southern Pinellas County reported a light snowfall on December 23, 1989. However, no snow fell at official weather stations, and the weather record indicates that light sleet fell on St. Petersburg that day.

The winter of 2009–2010 was one of the coldest in local history. Both Tampa and St. Petersburg set records for consecutive days in which the high temperature did not reach , and Tampa experienced ten consecutive days with a low temperature below freezing. Much of the area received a "wintry mix" of rain and sleet on January 9–10.

During El Niño, the Tampa Bay area receives cooler and wetter conditions during the dry season while during La Niña, the Tampa Bay area becomes drier and warmer than normal.

Precipitation and sunshine trends 
The historical averages during the late summer, especially September, are augmented by tropical cyclones, which can easily deposit many inches of rain in one day. Outside of the summer rainy season, most of the area's precipitation is delivered by the occasional passage of weather fronts.

Tampa's precipitation data falls near the median for the area. Nearby communities to the interior tend to receive a bit more rain every year; those closer to the coast a bit less.

The area receives plentiful sunshine throughout the year, averaging a total of 2920 hours, or 66.7% of the possible total. The daily sunshine amount is highest in May, when the sun's angle of incidence has increased the hours of daylight and the rainy season has not yet begun.

Tropical systems 

June through November is hurricane season in the Atlantic Basin and Caribbean Sea, with the most tropical activity occurring between mid-August to mid-October. Rain dropped by tropical systems is an important component of the area's annual precipitation and is vital for replenishing the water supply of communities around Tampa Bay.

The area is threatened by tropical systems almost every year and feels some effect from passing storms several times per decade. However, due to Tampa Bay's location on the west coast and the typical steering winds for storms, landfall in the area is very uncommon, with estimates of the probability of a hurricane making landfall in the Tampa Bay area during any given year ranging from 1 in 25 to 1 in 50. The small village of Tampa was devastated by the Great Gale of 1848, and the area suffered major damage during the  Tampa Bay Hurricane of 1921. Since then, however, Tampa Bay has not seen the landfall of any hurricane. Manatee County, which is technically not part of the Tampa Bay area, in 1946 was the site of a Category 1 hurricane that lost hurricane strength immediately after landfall.

The 2004 Atlantic Hurricane Season was historically busy for the Tampa Bay area. The region was affected by a record four hurricanes that year; Frances, Jeanne, Charley, and to a lesser extent, Ivan.  Jeanne and Frances passed over Tampa as tropical storms after making their way across the state from the east coast. Charley was forecast to make a direct hit on Tampa Bay from the south-southwest, which would have been the worst-case scenario for local storm surge flooding. But the storm made a sudden and unexpected turn to the northeast and brought only tropical storm force winds to the region, devastating the Ft. Myers/Port Charlotte area instead.  Ivan also threatened the area as it moved north up the eastern Gulf of Mexico. It remained far to the west of central Florida, however, and brought only a bit of rain and wind to Tampa Bay before eventually slamming into coastal Alabama and the Florida Panhandle.

On September 10, 2017, Hurricane Irma struck the Florida Keys and made landfall near Marco Island in southwest Florida as a Category 3 storm. Irma moved north up the length of the Florida peninsula and had weakened to a Category 1 storm by the time it neared central Florida. On the night of September 10 and 11, the eye passed east of Tampa through eastern Hillsborough County, bringing at least tropical storm winds to the entire Tampa Bay area. Irma caused significant damage to the region, particularly to the electrical grid.

Tampa data

See also
Climate of Florida

Notes

References

Tampa Bay
Climate of Florida